Perkins School may refer to:

Perkins School for the Blind, Watertown, Massachusetts
Perkins School of Theology at Southern Methodist University
Humphrey Perkins School, Leicestershire
Perkins High School (disambiguation), various locations
Perkins Local School District, Ohio